Fontenelle Apartments is a historic three-story building in Ogden, Utah. It was built in 1924-1927 by the McGregor Bros. Construction Company, and designed in the Spanish Colonial Revival and Prairie School styles. It has been listed on the National Register of Historic Places since December 31, 1987.

References

Buildings and structures in Ogden, Utah
National Register of Historic Places in Weber County, Utah
Mission Revival architecture in Utah
Prairie School architecture in Utah
Residential buildings completed in 1924
1924 establishments in Utah